Stephen Mark Peel (born 29 December 1965) is a British businessman, private equity investor, and Olympic athlete who, until 2014, was a senior partner at the global private equity firm TPG Capital. In 2017, Peel, together with Stefan Kowski and Bastian Lueken co-founded a new private equity firm, Novalpina Capital, which focused on control-orientated equity investments in European middle market businesses. Peel was dismissed from the fund by investors in 2021.  He is the founder of SMP Policy Innovation Ltd, a not-for-profit policy organisation aiming to promote, design and assist government policy.

Early life
Peel was born in Blackburn, Lancashire, on 29 December 1965. He was educated at King's School, Chester. He has a degree in land economy from Downing College, Cambridge in 1987, and is now a Wilkins Fellow. In 2015, he completed a Master of Applied Statistics degree at the Jackson Institute of Global Affairs at Yale University.

Rowing career
Peel represented Great Britain in coxless fours rowing at the 1988 Olympics in Seoul. He represented England and won a silver medal in the eight, at the 1986 Commonwealth Games in Edinburgh, Scotland.

Career
Peel worked at Goldman Sachs from 1989, founded TPG's European operations in 1997, ran their Russian and Eastern European operations from 2006 and co-headed the Asia operations from 2009 to 2013. In 2014, Peel left TPG Capital.

From 2016 to 2017, Peel served as a visiting fellow of practice at the Blavatnik School of Government at Oxford University. He is on the advisory council of the Jackson Institute for Global Affairs at Yale University.

In 2016, Peel established Novalpina Capital from which he was sacked in 2021. Prior to its fall from grace it was most notable for its majority stake (70 %) in Israeli surveillance technology firm NSO Group, acquired in February 2019. NSO has come under scrutiny, and has been the target of lawsuits, for developing remote-exploit software that can take over targeted mobile phones for covert surveillance and tracking purposes. Peel has communicated regularly with Amnesty International and other human-rights organisations to respond to their concerns about the use of NSO's software, saying that "every business in which we invest – including NSO – can and should be operated in accordance with all aspects of the UN Guiding Principles on Business and Human Rights," and that "highly targeted interception technologies play a critical role in protecting the public." This was contradicted publicly by Dana Ingleton, deputy head of tech at Amnesty, who said “Novalpina Capital’s promises of openness and transparency ring hollow when the return on their investment entirely depends on the spyware giant staying in the shadows.”, and Peel was forced to quit his post at human rights organisation Global Witness.

Personal life
He is married to Yana Peel, businesswoman, philanthropist and arts patron, most recently CEO of London's Serpentine Galleries, and they have two children. They married in 1999, and live in Bayswater, London.

References

Living people
1965 births
Alumni of Downing College, Cambridge
British investors
British investment bankers
Goldman Sachs people
TPG Capital
Yale University faculty
Olympic rowers of Great Britain
Rowers at the 1988 Summer Olympics
British male rowers
People from Blackburn with Darwen
People educated at The King's School, Chester
Commonwealth Games medallists in rowing
Commonwealth Games silver medallists for England
Rowers at the 1986 Commonwealth Games
Medallists at the 1986 Commonwealth Games